Sberbank City (former Mirax Plaza; Russian: Сбербанк-Сити) is a building complex in Moscow, Russia, that opened in November 2021.

It is located in Moscow Kutuzovsky prospect (crossing with Kulnev street). When planned, the complex was to have a monorail connection crossing the Moskva River to the Federation complex and parking spaces for 2,950 cars. The construction project was led by the Russian project developers Mirax Group, also responsible for the nearby 506 metre-high Federation Tower. Designed by Sergey Kisselev & Partners, the multifunctional complex comprises two towers with 41 and 47 floors, and lower buildings. The complex was to house offices and retail space for national and international companies, as well as restaurants and cafés.

References 

Buildings and structures in Moscow
Skyscrapers in Moscow